The Magerrain is a mountain of the Glarus Alps, located on the border between the cantons of Glarus and St. Gallen in Eastern Switzerland. Reaching an elevation of 2,524 metres above sea level, the Magerrain is the highest summit of the range north of the Walabützer Furggle (2,167 m) and the Risitenpass (2,189 m).

The closest locality is Engi on the south side.

References

External links
 Magerrain on Summitpost+

Mountains of the Alps
Mountains of Switzerland
Mountains of the canton of St. Gallen
Mountains of the canton of Glarus
Glarus–St. Gallen border
Two-thousanders of Switzerland